Sybra pascoei is a species of beetle in the family Cerambycidae. It was described by Lameere in 1893.

Subspecies
 Sybra pascoei ishigakii Breuning & Ohbayashi, 1964
 Sybra pascoei miyakensis Hayashi, 1972
 Sybra pascoei okinawana Breuning & Ohbayashi, 1967
 Sybra pascoei pascoei Lameere, 1893
 Sybra pascoei taiwanella Gressitt, 1951

References

pascoei
Beetles described in 1893